Arvid Frederick Nyholm (July 12, 1866 – November 14, 1927) was a Swedish-American artist, known primarily as a portrait and landscape painter.

Background
Arvid Frederick Nyholm was born in Stockholm, Sweden. His father, Karl Fredrik Nyholm, was also a printer. In 1886, he graduated from Södra Real-läroverket in Stockholm. He initially studied architecture at the Royal Institute of Technology from 1886–1887. He studied privately with the well-known Swedish artist, Anders Zorn. He also was a student at the Académie Colarossi in Paris. He was a student of theatre painting briefly at the Royal Academy in Stockholm from 1889 to 1891.

Career
He immigrated to New York, United States, in the autumn of 1891. He exhibited work in both the New York Watercolor Society exhibitions and at the National Academy of Design. He eventually settled in Chicago in 1903, where he was based for the remainder of his life.  He entered 30 annual exhibitions at the Art Institute of Chicago between 1904 and 1926. One of the founders of the Swedish-American Art Association in 1905, he exhibited with this group and in their subsequent exhibitions until his death.

Anders Zorn, his former teacher in Sweden, often turned portrait commissions his way.  He secured commissions for the portrait of Chicago-based architect and city planner, Daniel Hudson Burnham, Minnesota governor Adolph Olson Eberhart (1914) hanging in the Minnesota State Capitol building, and of Swedish-born engineer, John Ericsson, now in the National Portrait Gallery, Washington D.C.

His works were shown in numerous other museums and galleries, mostly in the Chicago area. His painting, "The Evening Circle" won first prize at the exhibition of Swedish-American artists in Chicago in 1912. He exhibited in Sweden at the 1920 Swedish-American exhibition in Stockholm and the Gothenburg exhibition of 1923. He received many awards and honors during the course of his career including the Municipal Art League Portrait Prize in 1915 and 1924, the Chicago Popular Prize in 1919, the Popular Prize at the Swedish-American Art Association in 1919 and the Chicago Galleries Association in 1927.

His works are held by a variety of institutions including the West Point Academy, the National Portrait Gallery, the Smithsonian Institution, the Iowa State Historical Society and the Wright Museum of Art at Beloit College.

Personal life
Nyholm was married in 1887 in Stockholm to Amelia Josephina Grönander with whom he had five children. His daughter, Gretta Nyholm, was also a Chicago artist.  He died in Chicago.

References

Other sources
Olson, Ernst W. ed.  History of the Swedes of Illinois (Chicago: Engberg-Holmberg Publishing Company, 1908)
Olson, Ernst W. The Swedish Element in Illinois: Survey of the Past Seven Decades (Chicago, IL: Swedish-American Biographical Association, 1917)
Haugan, Reidar Rye   Prominent Artists and Exhibits of Their Work in Chicago (Chicago Norske Klub. Nordmanns-Forbundet, 24: 371—374,Volume 7, 1933)
Kirn, Mary Em and Sherry Case Maurer, eds. Härute—Out Here : Swedish Immigrant Artists In Midwest America  (Rock Island, Illinois: Augustana College, 1984)
Gerdts, William.  Art Across America. Vol. 2 (New York, NY: Abbeville Press, 1990)

External links
Random Lake, Wis. 1915 by Arvid Nyholm
Greta by Arvid Nyholm
Flowers for the Party by Arvid Nyholm
Studio, inscribed 1913 by Arvid Nyholm

Artists from Stockholm
1866 births
1927 deaths
Swedish emigrants to the United States
Modern artists
Académie Colarossi alumni